"The Gift" is a song by English electronic music duo Way Out West featuring English singer Joanna Law, credited as Miss Joanna Law. It was released on the since defunct record label Deconstruction Records on 2 September 1996. The song reached #15 on the UK Singles Chart that year, and also peaked at #2 on the UK Dance Chart. It is the third single from their eponymous debut studio album Way Out West.

Background
The song uses a sample from Joanna Law's cover of "The First Time Ever I Saw Your Face", titled "First Time Ever". After its release, a music video for the song was also filmed. The song has been featured on many compilation albums, including Judge Jules' Trance Nation Anthems on Ministry of Sound.

"The Gift" received a 2010 update when Deconstruction re-released the song with additional remixes by Gui Boratto, Michael Woods, Tek-One and Way Out West themselves. The group's own remix of the song featured on their 2010 remix album, We Love Machine – The Remixes.

Formats and track listings

In popular culture
 The song is featured as the theme music for the 1998 MTV music television series, True Life.
 The song was performed live on the British television show Top of the Pops in 1996.

Charts

References

1996 singles
1996 songs
Deconstruction Records singles
Way Out West (duo) songs
Songs written by Chicane (musician)